The Emami Kolkata Open ATP Challenger Tour (formerly known as State Bank of India ATP Challenger Tour) is a professional tennis tournament played on outdoor hard courts. It is currently part of the ATP Challenger Tour. It is held annually at the Bengal Tennis Association Stadium in Kolkata, India since 2014.

Past finals

Singles

Doubles

References